Adi ibn Zayd al-Ibadi al-Tamimi was a 6th-century Arab Christian poet from an Ibadi family of al-Hirah.

He was married to the granddaughter of the Lakhmid ruler al-Nu'man III ibn al-Mundhir, and is said to have helped al-Nu'man accede to power as ruler of al-Hirah. He also served as the secretary (dabir) for Arab affairs under the Sasanian king Hormizd IV. He is featured in Adî ibn Zayd and the Princess Hind, a tale in the Arabian Nights.

References

Sources 
 Francesco Gabrieli, "ʿAdī ibn Zaid, il poeta di al-Ḥīrah", in: Rendiconti dell'Accademia Nazionale dei Lincei, classe di scienze morali, serie VIII, vol. I (1946), pp. 81-96 (in Italian).

External links
 His poets (Arabic)  in poetsgate.com
 Adi bin Zayd and the princess Hind

550 births
600 deaths
6th-century Arabic poets
Arab Christians in Mesopotamia
Arabs from the Sasanian Empire
One Thousand and One Nights characters
Officials of the Sasanian Empire
Lakhmids
Christians in the Sasanian Empire